= Neosporidesmium xanthophylli =

Scientific classification
- Kingdom: Fungi
- Division: Ascomycota
- Class: incertae sedis
- Genus: Neosporidesmium
- Species: N. xanthophylli

Binomial name
- Neosporidesmium xanthophylli Jian Ma & X.G. Zhang

Species of fungus

Neosporidesmium xanthophylli is a species of anamorphic ascomycete fungi, first found in tropical forests in Hainan, China, specifically in dead branches of Xanthophyllum hainanense, hence its name.
